Brian Davison (25 May 1942 – 15 April 2008), was a British musician. He is best known for playing drums with The Mark Leeman Five, The Nice, Brian Davison's Every Which Way and Refugee.

Biography

Towards the end of the 1950s, he played in various skiffle groups in small clubs in the north-west of London. He quietly established a reputation as a drummer until the early 1960s when he joined The Mark Leeman Five in 1963, with Mark Leeman on vocals, Alan Roskams on guitar, Dave Hyde on bass and Terry Goldberg on piano. They recorded a series of singles during their career as well as an album published in 1963, Rhythm and Blues Plus!, which contains among others, a song by Willie Dixon You can't judge a book by its cover and one from Mud Morganfeld Got my mojo working, as well as other pieces from rhythm and blues. In 1965, after singer Mark Leeman died in a car accident, the band members recruited another singer Roger Peacock and the band continued until 1966 before disbanding.

At this time he created with Brian Wilson - not to be confused with the bassist of the Beach Boys -, guitar and vocals and a bassist, the trio The Habits, which will release a single Elbow Baby produced by Spencer Davis. This group came to France and played in Marseille (in a small ephemeral club L'Elbow) and in Cogolin at La Jasse.

Brian Davison then formed the psychedelic band Shinn with Donald Donn Shinn on keyboards, Paul Newton on bass (future member of Uriah Heep) and singer Eddie Lamb . They do a few gigs but don't produce any records. Then in 1967, Brian replaced drummer Ian Hague in a new band, The Nice, with ex-Gary Farr & The T-Bones Keith Emerson on organ and piano and Keith Lee Jackson on bass and vocals as well as guitarist and trumpeter David O'List, ex-member of The Attack. They released their first album in 1967 on the Immediate Records label, entitled The thoughts of Emerlist Davjack after an anagram of the musicians' names. The album contains a very personal interpretation of a piece by Dave Brubeck, Rondo from Blue Rondo À La Turk.

After a second album, Ars Longa Vita Brevis in the vein of the first which sees the departure of guitarist David O'List to form the group Roxy Music with which he will remain very little, The Nice continued as a trio until it broke up in 1969 when Keith Emerson, seeking to broaden his horizons, disbanded the group and formed the trio Emerson, Lake & Palmer.

Brian Davison's Every Which Way 
Brian Davison then founded another group, Brian Davison's Every Which Way and released an eponymous album on the Charisma label in 1970, with Graham Bell on vocals, acoustic guitar and electric piano, John Hedley on electric guitar, Alan Cartwright on bass, Geoffrey Peach on flute, horns and backing vocals and of course Brian himself on drums. In a rhythm and blues and free jazz vein, the album contains the long blues Bed Ain't What It Used To Be, but goes completely unnoticed and, due to low sales, the group split up. Davison is then forced to play with small unknown formations. He plays for Wolfgang Dauner, then does a few sessions as a studio musician. He thus played with Keith Emerson and Lee Jackson of Nice for the last time on an album of Roy Harper, Flat, Baroque & Berserk in 1970, the piece Hell's Angels.

He did it again in 1973, again with Roy Harper for the album Lifemask, on which he played on the long suite The Lord's prayer. Lee Jackson, for his part, formed his own group Jackson Heights after the separation of Nice, and after their fourth album Bump n' grind, approached the Swiss keyboardist Patrick Moraz so that he joins them but the latter refuses and proposes instead to form another group with him, Refugee. It was then that Brian Davison reunited with his former companion from Nice and an eponymous album was produced in 1974. They did a few concerts then Moraz auditioned for the group Yes and left the trio; British keyboardist Graham Bond was considered a possible replacement but after an audition the combination proved impractical. While Jackson then retired from music to focus on a career as a designer, Davison persevered in playing with the band Gong on tour for a while before scraping by again with small local bands.

Vivacitas 
In 2002, Keith Emerson reformed The Nice with Lee Jackson, Brian Davison and guitarist Dave Kilminster, augmented for a few songs by Phil Williams on bass and Pete Riley on drums. A tour of England followed and an album Vivacitas published in 2003, with songs from Nice including the double America/Rondo as well as classics such as Karelia Suite, She belongs to me and Hang on to a dream. Also included are pieces by Emerson, Lake & Palmer such as Tarkus, Honky Tonk Train Blues and Fanfare for a common man. This triple album also contains an interview with Chris Welch by Keith Emerson recorded in 2001.

Davison taught drumming at Bideford College. He died of a brain tumour on 15 April 2008 at home in Horns Cross Bideford, Devon, aged 65.

Discography

Mark Leeman Five

Singles 
 1965 : Portland Town/Gotta get myself together : Columbia – DB 7452
 1965 : Blow my blues away/On the horizon : Columbia – DB 7648
 1966 : Forbidden Fruit/Going To Bluesville : Columbia - DB 7812
 1966 : Follow me/Gather Up The Pieces : Columbia – DB 7955 Promo Single

Album 
 1963 : Rhythm and Blues Plus! : serial number unknown

Compilations 
 1971 : Rock Generation Volume 8 - Soft Machine At The Beginning - Mark Leeman Five And Davy Graham : Byg Records - 529.708 
 1991 : The Mark Leeman Five – Memorial Album : See For Miles Records Ltd.	SEE CD 317 - Available on CD

The Nice

Studio Albums 
 1968: The Thoughts of Emerlist Davjack (Immediate)
 1968: Ars Longa Vita Brevis (Immediate)
 1969: Nice (Immediate)

Live Albums 
 1970: Five Bridges (Charisma)
 1971: Elegy (Charisma)
 1996: America – The BBC Sessions (Receiver)
 2001: The Swedish Radio Sessions  (Sanctuary)
 2002: BBC Sessions (Sanctuary)
 2003: Vivacitas (Sanctuary)
 2009: Live at the Fillmore East December 1969 (Virgin)

Singles 
 1967 : The Thoughts of Emerlist Davjack / Azrael (Angel of Death) (Immediate)
 1968 : America / Diamond Hard Blue Apples of the Moon (Immediate, 1968)
 1968 : Brandenburger / Happy Freuds (Immediate)
 1969 : Diary of an Empty Day / Hang On to a Dream (Immediate)
 1969 : Country Pie / Brandenburg Concerto #6 / One of Those People (Charisma)

Collaborations 
 1967 :  Don't Burst My Bubble/Come Home Baby (Side One P. P. Arnold with Small Faces - Side Two Rod Stewart with P. P. Arnold) (Keith Emerson is on Hammond organ on side two with Rod Stewart on vocals, Ron Wood on guitar, Keith Richards on bass, Nicky Hopkins on electric piano Mickey Waller on drums - Immediate Records)
 1969 : An Old Raincoat Won't Ever Let You Down by Rod Stewart (Keith plays organ on I Wouldn't Ever Change a Thing)
 1969 : Music From Free Creek - Various artists. (1969) (Keith plays on 3 songs)
 2013 : The Theory of Everything de Ayreon (Keith on synthesizer on the song Progressive Waves. - With Steve Hackett, John Wetton, Rick Wakeman and Jordan Rudess who also play on the album)

Compilations 
 Hang on to a dream - Esperar un sueno (Emidisc 1C 048-50 722 - 1970)
 The Nice (Phillips 9299 718 - 1970)
 The best of The Nice (Immediate 1C 048-90 674 - 1970)
 Keith Emerson With The Nice (Mercury – 830 457-2 M-1 - 1971) Include albums Five Bridges Suite and Elegy
 Keith Emerson With The Nice Vol 2 (Fontana 9286 862 1971)
 In memoriam (Immediate 2C 054 - 95954 - 1972)
 Autumn '67 - Spring '68 (Charisma, 1972, UK) Reedited under the title : Autumn to Spring (Charisma, 1973, USA)
 The Immediate Story (Double CD - Sire SASH - 37102 - 1975)
 Amoeni Redivivi (Immediate IML1003 - 1976)
 Greatest Hits (Immediate IML 2003 - 1977)
 Ars Longa Vita Brevis (3 LP Box - Charly Records 26 76 210 - 1977)
 The Immediate Years (3 LP Box - Charly Records CDIMMBOX2 - Charly Schallplatten GmbH - 1995 Germany)
 Nice Hits Nice Bits (BMG Fabricated, 1999)
 The Immediate Collection (Recall Records - 1999 Double CD Album)
 Here Comes The Nice The Immediate Anthology (3CD Castle Music - CMETD 055 - 2000)
 Keith Emerson & The Nice Absolutely The Best (True North 1003941 - 2001) 
 BBC Sessions - Ian Hague on drums on Flower King Of Flies, Sombrero Sam and Rondo recorded for the television show Top Gera. 
 Artistes Variés -  Immediate Pleasure - Including Rod Stewart and P.P. Arnold, Come home baby and two songs from The Nice, The Thoughts of Emerlist Davjack and America (2002). 
 The best of The Nice, The Small Faces. Humble Pie, Eric Clapton & John Mayall (Immediate - 1C 148-92 661/662) Double Album
 The Nice & The Humble Pie*- Famous Popgroups Of The '60s Vol. 4 (Music For Pleasure – 1M 146-94319/20) - CD 1 The Nice - CD 2 Humble Pie) Double Album

Brian Davison's Every Which Way 
 1970 : Brian Davison's Every Which Way

Refugee 
 1974 : Refugee
 2007 : Live in Concert Newcastle City Hall 1974 
 2010 : Refugee & Refugee Live In Concert 1974 Both albums were reedited on Floating World Records.

Collaborations 
 Roy Harper 
 1970 : Flat, Baroque & Berserk - The Nice, (Keith Emerson, Lee Jackson and Brian Davison) play on the song Hell's Angels.
 1973 : Lifemask - Brian Davison plays drums on the long suite suite The Lord's Prayer.

References

External links
 Brian “Blinky” Davison at Find a Grave

1942 births
2008 deaths
English rock drummers
British male drummers
People from Leicester
Musicians from Leicestershire
Progressive rock drummers
The Nice members
Refugee (band) members
20th-century British male musicians